Noah Lolesio (born 18 December 1999) is an Australian rugby union player who plays for the Brumbies in Super Rugby, and for the Wallabies (the Australian national team). His playing position is Fly-half. He is also able to play as a centre. He has signed for the Brumbies squad in 2019. Lolesio graduated from The Southport School, in which he played in their first XV.

References

External links 
 Noah Lolesio at Wallabies
 Noah Lolesio at ItsRugby.co.uk
 Noah Lolesio at ESPNscrum

Australian sportspeople of Samoan descent
Australian people of New Zealand descent
Australian rugby union players
Australia international rugby union players
Living people
Rugby union centres
1999 births
Rugby union fly-halves
Canberra Vikings players
ACT Brumbies players
Rugby union players from Auckland